Chengmari is a settlement in the far west of Bhutan. It is located between Samtse and Sibsu in Samtse District, close to the border with India.
Lions Boys Club

It is home to the largest tea estate in Asia that produces over 3 million kilograms of black tea and around a million kilograms of green tea. The tea estate significantly contributes to the lives of more than 12000 people living in the area.

References 
Armington, S. (2002) Bhutan. (2nd ed.) Melbourne: Lonely Planet.

Populated places in Bhutan